Jeffry Eyeri Miranda Miguel (born 3 September 2002) is a Honduran footballer currently playing as a forward for Marathón.

He made his professional debut on 17 April 2019 as a sixteen-year-old, scoring during a 6–0 win over Honduras Progreso.

Career statistics

Club

References

Living people
2002 births
Honduran footballers
Honduras youth international footballers
Association football forwards
Liga Nacional de Fútbol Profesional de Honduras players
C.D. Marathón players
People from Cortés Department